Johnson Bay is a bay in Lubec, Maine, United States.

It is separated from the Lubec Channel by Lubec Neck to the southeast and from Cobscook Bay by Seward Neck to the west. It is bounded on the north by Moose Island in Eastport and on the east by Campobello Island, New Brunswick, Canada.

The bay extends roughly 3 mi. (5 km).

Bays of Washington County, Maine
Eastport, Maine
Lubec, Maine
Bays of Maine